Anelise Chen is an American writer of fiction and nonfiction. She was named "5 under 35" by the National Book Foundation in 2019. Her first novel, So Many Olympic Exertions, was published in 2017 by Kaya Press and was named one of the best books of the year by Brooklyn Rail. She holds degrees from UC Berkeley (B.A. English) and New York University (MFA Fiction). Her essays and reviews have appeared in The New York Times, National Public Radio, BOMB Magazine, The New Republic, Vice, and The Village Voice. She writes a column on mollusks for Paris Review.

She lives in New York City and teaches at Columbia University.

References

Living people
American women novelists
21st-century American novelists
21st-century American women writers
Columbia University faculty
UC Berkeley College of Letters and Science alumni
New York University alumni
American writers of Taiwanese descent
American women writers of Chinese descent
Taiwanese emigrants to the United States
Year of birth missing (living people)
American women academics